Rutelaget Askøy–Bergen AS or A–B was a ferry and bus operating company that provided services from Askøy to Bergen, Norway. Founded in 1950, it operated a car ferry across the sound, and bus traffic on Askøy and to Bergen. The ferry route was discontinued in 1992 when the Askøy Bridge opened. It also operated ferries between Bergen and Stavanger and in Boknafjord. In 1992 the subsidiary Fjord Line was established, providing cruiseferry services from Bergen and Egersund to Hanstholm in Denmark. The two companies merged in 1995, and were subsequently bought by Bergen Nordhordland Rutelag, after a bid from Color Line was found to be too low.

References

1950 establishments in Norway
Bus companies of Vestland
Ferry companies of Rogaland
Ferry companies of Vestland
Transport companies established in 1950
1995 disestablishments in Norway
Transport in Bergen
Askøy
Transport companies disestablished in 1955